Frederick Hill (17 January 1940 – 1 October 2021) was an English footballer who played at both professional and international levels as an inside forward.

Club career
Born in Sheffield, Hill began his career with the junior team of Bolton Wanderers, turning professional in 1957. He later played for Halifax Town, Manchester City and Peterborough United, making over 500 appearances in the Football League. He later played in Ireland for Cork Hibernians, and in non-league with Droylsden and Radcliffe Borough, before ending his career playing in Sweden. Hill was inducted into the Peterborough United F.C. Hall of Fame in February 2010.

International career
Hill earned two caps for the England national team in 1962, and also earned 10 caps for England at under-23 level.

Later life and death
Hill turned 80 in January 2020. He was twice hospitalised later that year.

Hill died on 1 October 2021, at the age of 81.

References

1940 births
2021 deaths
Footballers from Sheffield
English footballers
England international footballers
England under-23 international footballers
Bolton Wanderers F.C. players
Halifax Town A.F.C. players
Peterborough United F.C. players
Manchester City F.C. players
Cork Hibernians F.C. players
Droylsden F.C. players
Radcliffe F.C. players
English Football League players
English Football League representative players
Association football inside forwards
Oswestry Town F.C. managers
English football managers